Mingus in Europe Volume II is a live album by the jazz bassist and composer Charles Mingus, recorded in 1964 in Germany and released on the Enja label in 1980.

Reception

The AllMusic review by Scott Yanow stated: "Although this music could be called avant-garde, there is nothing random about the notes picked or the many emotions expressed".

Track listing
All compositions by Charles Mingus except as indicated
 "Orange Was the Color of Her Dress, Then Blue Silk" - 17:00
 "Sophisticated Lady" (Duke Ellington, Irving Mills, Mitchell Parish) - 3:44
 "AT-FW-YOU" (Jaki Byard) - 5:09
 "Peggy's Blue Skylight" - 11:32
 "So Long Eric" - 22:51 Bonus track on CD reissue

Personnel
Charles Mingus - bass (tracks 1, 2, 4 & 5)
Eric Dolphy – alto saxophone, bass clarinet, flute (tracks 1, 2, 4 & 5)
Clifford Jordan – tenor saxophone (tracks 1, 2, 4 & 5)
Jaki Byard – piano 
Dannie Richmond – drums (tracks 1, 2, 4 & 5)

References

Charles Mingus live albums
1983 live albums
Enja Records live albums